Holy Trinity Church is a Romanesque-Baroque basilica in Strzelno consecrated in 1216. It forms part of the former Norbertine Abbey complex, which is listed as a Historic Monument of Poland.

Gallery

References

Churches in Poland
Romanesque architecture in Poland
Baroque church buildings in Poland
Strzelno
Mogilno County
13th-century establishments in Poland